Ornidazole is an antibiotic used to treat protozoan infections. A synthetic nitroimidazole, it is commercially obtained from an acid-catalyzed reaction between 2-methyl-5-nitroimidazole and epichlorohydrin. Antimicrobial spectrum is similar to that of metronidazole and is more well tolerated; however there are concerns of lower relative efficacy.

It was first introduced for treating trichomoniasis before being recognized for its broad anti-protozoan and anti-anaerobic-bacterial capacities. has also been investigated for use in Crohn's disease after bowel resection.

References

Antiprotozoal agents
Disulfiram-like drugs
Poultry diseases
Nitroimidazole antibiotics
Organochlorides
Halohydrins